Lakeside Union School District is a Kindergarten - 8th grade public school district in Bakersfield, California. The district has 2 schools, and serves Southwest Bakersfield.

References

External links
 

School districts in Kern County, California
1941 establishments in California